The 2021 Armenian Supercup was the 24th Armenian Supercup, an annual football match played between the winners of the previous season's Premier League, Alashkert, and the previous season's Armenian Cup, Ararat Yerevan, with the former winning 1–0 thanks to a goal from José Embaló.

Background

Alashkert won their fourth League.
Ararat Yerevan won their sixth Armenian Cup title after beating Alashkert 3–1 in the final in May 2021.

Match details

See also
2020–21 Armenian Premier League
2020–21 Armenian Cup

Notes

References

Football in Armenia